Arthur Godbout (December 13, 1872 – March 12, 1932) was a Canadian lawyer, politician, and judge.

Born in Lambton, Quebec, Godbout studied at the Séminaire de Québec and the Université Laval à Montréal. He was called to the Bar of Quebec in 1898 and was created a King's Counsel in 1912. He was a lawyer in Saint-Georges-Est and Saint-Joseph.

He was elected to the Legislative Assembly of Quebec for Beauce in a 1902 by-election. A Liberal, he was re-elected in 1908 and 1912. He was acclaimed in 1916 and re-elected in 1919. In 1921, he was appointed a judge for the district court in Beauce.

References

1872 births
1932 deaths
Canadian King's Counsel
Judges in Quebec
Quebec Liberal Party MNAs
Lawyers in Quebec